This is a list of Members of Parliament (MPs) elected or assigned to the Founding Assembly of the Turkish Republic of Northern Cyprus. 40 elected members of the founding assembly were coming from the Federated Assembly as the base members. These members were elected at the 1981 parliamentary election, which was held on 28 June 1981.

30 other members were assigned by the Presidency, various political parties, non-governmental organisations, trade unions, chamber of industry, chamber of commerce and the bar association. Fazıl Küçük also assigned one member by himself. The representative members were regarded as independent unless stated otherwise.

Founding Assembly's duty started on 6 December 1983

The list below indicates the MPs in the parties at the time they took oath.

Composition

Elected members 

Elected members were the members who were already chosen as MPs for the Federated Assembly of the Turkish Federated State of Cyprus and thus served during the Interim Parliament of the Turkish Republic of Northern Cyprus. The Founding Assembly did not have seats allocated for districts. Following list only designate their district of election during 1981 parliamentary election.

Lefkoşa

Gazimağusa

Girne

Representative members 
Representative members were not elected to the assembly. They were assigned by political parties, individuals or institutions listed below. Assigned people were regarded as independent unless they were assigned by a political party or was already a council minister from a party at the day of assignation.

Term and changes of affiliation 
Assigned members were not elected to the assembly. They were assigned by political parties, individuals or institutions listed below. Assigned people were regarded as independent unless they were assigned by a political party or was a council minister from a party at the day he was assigned.

A

B

C

Ç

D

E

F

G

H

K

L

O

Ö

P

R

S

Ş

T

U

V

References 

Members of the Assembly of the Republic (Northern Cyprus)